The Shadow in the Courtyard (other English-language titles are Maigret Mystified and The Shadow Puppet) is a detective novel by Belgian writer Georges Simenon, featuring his character inspector Jules Maigret. The novel was written in Antibes in December 1931 and was published a month later, in January 1932, by the Parisian publishing house Fayard.

Translations
The book has been translated three times into English: in 1934 by Anthony Abbot as The Shadow in the Courtyard , in 1964 as Maigret Mystified by Jean Stewart, and in 2015 by Ros Schwartz as The Shadow Puppet.

The first German translation by Milo Dor and Reinhard Federmann was published by Kiepenheuer & Witsch in 1959. The new translation by Claus Sprick was published by Diogenes Verlag in 1982.

Adaptations
The novel has been adapted five times for film and television: in Italian in 2004 as L'ombra cinese, with Sergio Castellitto in the main role and in 1966 as L'ombra cinese, with Gino Cervi in the lead role; in French in 2004 as L'ombre chinoise, with Bruno Cremer in the main role and in 1969 as L'Ombre chinoise with Jean Richard in the lead role; in English in 1961 as Shadow Play, with Rupert Davies in the main role.

Reception
Anthony Boucher of The New York Times summarized the novel in 1964: "Maigret works against a background of respectable middle-class apartments, a cheap music hall and a sordid hotel in the Place Pigalle, all vividly realized, to solve a safe-robbery-plus-murder that reveals an unusually well-characterized killer".

Bibliography

References

External links

Maigret at trussel.com

1932 Belgian novels
Maigret novels
Novels set in France
Novels set in the 20th century